Vicksburg Township is a township in Jewell County, Kansas, USA.  As of the 2000 census, its population was 28.

Geography
Vicksburg Township covers an area of 35.77 square miles (92.64 square kilometers). The streams of East Marsh Creek, Prairie Creek, Rankin Creek and West Marsh Creek run through this township.

Adjacent townships
 Grant Township (north)
 Courtland Township, Republic County (northeast)
 Beaver Township, Republic County (east)
 Grant Township, Cloud County (southeast)
 Allen Township (south)
 Prairie Township (southwest)
 Buffalo Township (west)
 Washington Township (northwest)

Cemeteries
The township contains one cemetery, Caldwell.

Major highways
 K-148

References
 U.S. Board on Geographic Names (GNIS)
 United States Census Bureau cartographic boundary files

External links
 US-Counties.com
 City-Data.com

Townships in Jewell County, Kansas
Townships in Kansas